Julio César Armentia (born August 2, 1974 in San Cayetano (Buenos Aires), Argentina) is a former Argentine footballer who last played for Rivadavia de Necochea in the regionalised fifth level of the Argentine football league system.

External links
 
 Julio César Armentia at playmakerstats.com (English version of ceroacero.es)

1974 births
Living people
Argentine footballers
Argentine expatriate footballers
Club Cipolletti footballers
Ñublense footballers
Cobreloa footballers
O'Higgins F.C. footballers
Primera B de Chile players
Chilean Primera División players
Expatriate footballers in Chile
Expatriate footballers in Mexico
Expatriate footballers in Bolivia
Association football goalkeepers
Sportspeople from Buenos Aires Province